Kakusei may refer to:

 Kakusei (Go), a Go competition in Japan
 Kakusei (album), an album by DJ Krush
 Fire Emblem: Kakusei, a Nintendo 3DS video game